Theodore Crawford Cassidy (July 31, 1932 – January 16, 1979) was an American actor, noted for his tall stature at , and his unusual facial features and deep voice which were due to acromegaly. He tended to play unusual characters in offbeat or science-fiction works such as Star Trek and I Dream of Jeannie, and he played Lurch on The Addams Family in the mid-1960s. He also narrated The Incredible Hulk TV series and voiced The Hulk in the show’s first 2 seasons.

Early life
Cassidy was born in Pittsburgh, Pennsylvania, of Irish ancestry, and raised in Philippi, West Virginia. In his youth, he was academically gifted and attended third grade at age six. During his freshman year of high school, at age 11, he was on the football and basketball teams. 

After graduating from high school, Cassidy attended West Virginia Wesleyan College in Buckhannon, where he was a member of the Alpha Sigma Phi fraternity. He transferred to Stetson University in DeLand, Florida, where he played college basketball for the Hatters and was active in the student government.

Career
After graduating with a degree in speech and drama, he married Margaret Helen Jesse in 1956, and they moved to Dallas, Texas. His acting career launched when he worked as a midday DJ on WFAA in Dallas. He also occasionally appeared on WFAA-TV Channel 8, playing Creech, an outer-space creature on the "Dialing for Dollars" segments on Ed Hogan's afternoon movies. He gave an in-studio report from WFAA radio station on the day John F. Kennedy was assassinated, and was among the first to interview eyewitnesses W. E. Newman Jr. and Gayle Newman.

Television

Cassidy's height gave him an advantage in auditioning for unusual character roles. His best-known role is Lurch on The Addams Family, in which he feigned playing the harpsichord (although he was in fact an accomplished organist). He also played the character named Thing, though associate producer Jack Voglin would take over the role in scenes involving both characters. Though the character of Lurch was originally intended to be mute, when Cassidy ad-libbed "You rang?" in response to the butler call, it was an immediate hit. It became his signature line, and he was given more lines. Several episodes were written to feature Lurch.

Cassidy reprised the role of Lurch in later appearances. In the Batman episode "The Penguin's Nest" (1966), he appears during the heroes' familiar climbing scene up the side of a building, as a tenant who is playing the Addams Family theme on a harpsichord prior to sticking his head out of the window and speaking to Batman and Robin. He voiced Lurch in an episode of The New Scooby-Doo Movies (1972), and in the 1973 animated series adaptation of The Addams Family.
According to Thomas "Duke " Miller, a TV/movie/celebrity expert, Cassidy also had a small role opposite George Peppard in one episode of the TV movie series "Banacek." Cassidy played a worker in an auto scrapyard who attempted to kill Banacek because the investigator was trying to get a conviction on the brother of Cassidy's character. 
In addition to The Addams Family, Cassidy found steady work in a variety of other television shows. He had a prominent role on NBC's The New Adventures of Huckleberry Finn as Injun Joe, the blood-enemy of Tom Sawyer and Huck. In the 1967 The Man from U.N.C.L.E. episode "The Napoleon's Tomb Affair", Cassidy played a henchman, Edgar, who kidnaps, tortures, and repeatedly tries to kill Napoleon and Illya. 

Cassidy also provided the voices of the more aggressive version of Balok in the Star Trek episode "The Corbomite Maneuver" and the Gorn in the episode "Arena", and played the part of the android Ruk in the episode "What Are Little Girls Made Of?". Cassidy did more work with Star Trek creator Gene Roddenberry in the early 1970s, playing Isaiah in the postapocalyptic drama pilots Genesis II and Planet Earth. In the Lost in Space episode "The Thief from Outer Space", he played the Slave to the alien Thief (Malachi Throne), who threatens the Robinsons.

In The Beverly Hillbillies episode "The Dahlia Feud" from 1967, he played Mr. Ted, a large, muscular gardener who plants dahlias for Mrs. Drysdale. In 1968, Cassidy appeared on Mannix in the episode "To Kill a Writer" as Felipe Montoya, on Daniel Boone in "The Scrimshaw Ivory Chart" as a pirate named Gentle Sam, and in two episodes of I Dream of Jeannie as the master of Jeannie's devious sister in the episode "Genie, Genie, Who's Got the Genie?", and Jeannie's cousin in the episode "Please Don't Feed the Astronauts".

In the two-part The Six Million Dollar Man episode "The Return of Bigfoot" (1976), Cassidy provided the body and vocal effects of Bigfoot (the role was originally played by professional wrestler André the Giant in a previous two-parter). Cassidy reprised the role in the 1977 episode "Bigfoot V".

Cassidy also starred in Bonanza'''s "Decision in Los Robles" in 1970.

Other film and TV work
Concurrent with his appearances on The Addams Family, Cassidy began doing character voices on a recurring basis for the Hanna-Barbera Studios, culminating in the role of Frankenstein Jr., in Frankenstein Jr. and The Impossibles series, and even reprising Lurch on several occasions for Hanna-Barbera productions (most notably for the Addams Family animated series in 1973-74). He was the voice of Meteor Man in Birdman and the Galaxy Trio, as well as the hero in the Chuck Menville pixillated short film Blaze Glory, in which his already-deep voice was enhanced with reverb echo to give the character an exaggerated super-hero sound. Cassidy also voiced Ben Grimm ("The Thing") in The New Fantastic Four. Cassidy went on to perform the roars and growls for Godzilla in the 1979 cartoon series that Hanna-Barbera co-produced with Toho, and was also the voice of Montaro in the Jana of the Jungle segments that accompanied Godzilla during its first network run. His voice was the basis for the sinister voice of Black Manta, as well as Brainiac and several others on Super Friends. Cassidy was the original voice of Moltar and Metallus on Space Ghost from 1966 to 1968. Cassidy's final role was as King Thun of the Lion Men in the television animated feature film Flash Gordon: The Greatest Adventure of All. That particular role was originally recorded shortly before Cassidy's death in 1979, until the decision was made to use the footage for a television series, The New Adventures of Flash Gordon. As such, Cassidy's death necessitated his role being recast for the series with Allan Melvin. After the series' conclusion, the original feature film and soundtrack were reassembled using Cassidy's performance and broadcast in prime time in 1982. In live-action productions for the TV series The Incredible Hulk, he provided narration of the title sequence, and the Hulk's growls and roars. In deleted scenes from the original Battlestar Galactica TV pilot movie, "Saga of a Star World", Cassidy can be heard providing temporary voice tracks of the Cylon Imperious Leader, before actor Patrick Macnee was contracted to voice the character.

Other film work includes Butch Cassidy and the Sundance Kid (1969), Mackenna's Gold (1969), The Limit (1972), Banacek (1972),Charcoal Black (1972), The Slams (1973), Thunder County (1974), Poor Pretty Eddie (1975), Harry and Walter Go to New York (1976), The Last Remake of Beau Geste (1977) and Goin' Coconuts (1978). Alongside Michael Werner, he co-wrote the screenplay of 1973's The Harrad Experiment, in which he made a brief appearance. During that time, he also worked with Noel Marshall, the executive producer of Harrad Experiment, on the adventure-comedy film Roar (released two years after his death).

In 1965, he released a seven-inch vinyl record on Capitol Records with two songs on it: "The Lurch", written by Gary S. Paxton, and "Wesley", written by Cliffie Stone and Scott Turner. He introduced the dance and performed the song "The Lurch" on September 11, 1965, on Shivaree! and performed it again on Halloween of the same year on Shindig!''

Death
Cassidy underwent surgery at St. Vincent Medical Center in Los Angeles to have a benign tumor removed from his heart. The tumor had formed as a result of the long-term effects of the condition acromegaly, which was also responsible for his deep voice, facial structure, and tall stature. Complications arose several days later while he was recuperating at home. He was readmitted to the same hospital, where he died on January 16, 1979, at age 46. He was cremated and his ashes were scattered in his backyard.

Filmography

References

External links
 
 
 
 
 Legacy.com – Ted Cassidy

1932 births
1979 deaths
20th-century American male actors
American male film actors
American male television actors
American male voice actors
American men's basketball players
Basketball players from Pennsylvania
Basketball players from West Virginia
Centers (basketball)
Hanna-Barbera people
Male actors from Pittsburgh
Male actors from West Virginia
People from Philippi, West Virginia
People with acromegaly
Stetson Hatters men's basketball players
West Virginia Wesleyan College alumni	
American people of Irish descent